The Košice Peace Marathon (Slovak: Medzinárodný maratón mieru) is an annual road marathon held in Košice, Slovakia, since 1924.  It is the oldest marathon in Europe and the third-oldest in the world (after the Boston Marathon, first held in 1897, and the Yonkers Marathon, first held in 1907).  The marathon generally takes place each year on the first Sunday in October.  The course is relatively flat and consists of two loops, mostly within the city center.

The marathon is an AIMS-certified race.  It is also categorized as a Silver Label Road Race by World Athletics, and was certified as a 5-Star Quality Road Race by European Athletics Running for All in 2015.

History 

The first race was held in 1924.  The first women's race was held in 1980.

In 2016, the marathon received IAAF Bronze Label Road Race status, and in 2018, it received IAAF Silver Label Road Race status.

Course 

The course is flat, completely asphalted and traffic free, two laps in the historic city center.

Winners 

The course records are 2:24:35 for women (set by Ayuntu Tadesse in 2021) and 2:07:01 hours for men (set by Lawrence Kimaiyo in 2012).

Note: winners are listed below for five of the seven war years (1938–44), five war winners are listed at official homepage too, although the history provided by the Košice Peace Marathon states:  "The Slovakian Marathon suffered a cleft seven years wide. To some extent this was patched up with five marathons organized under the Hungarian flag during the Horthy occupation of Košice – without a single foreign runner..." Its status as the oldest marathon in Europe, and second-oldest in the world, remains undiminished by this break.

Key: Course record (in bold)

Notes

References

List of winners
Kosice International Peace Marathon. Association of Road Racing Statisticians (2011-10-04). Retrieved on 2011-10-23.

External links 

Official website
Some history  
Marathon Info 

Recurring sporting events established in 1924
Marathons in Europe
Marathon
Sports competitions in Czechoslovakia
Athletics competitions in Slovakia
Annual sporting events in Slovakia
1924 establishments in Slovakia
Autumn events in Czechoslovakia
Autumn events in Slovakia